German submarine U-285 was a Type VIIC U-boat of Nazi Germany's Kriegsmarine during World War II.

The submarine was laid down on 7 July 1942 at the Bremer Vulkan yard at Bremen-Vegesack as yard number 50. She was launched on 3 April 1943 and commissioned on 15 May under the command of Oberleutnant zur See Otto Walter.

Design
German Type VIIC submarines were preceded by the shorter Type VIIB submarines. U-285 had a displacement of  when at the surface and  while submerged. She had two shafts and two  propellers.

U-285 was fitted with five  torpedo tubes (four fitted at the bow and one at the stern), fourteen torpedoes, one  SK C/35 naval gun, 220 rounds, and two twin  C/30 anti-aircraft guns. The boat had a complement of between forty-four and sixty.

Service history
U-285 served with the 8th U-boat Flotilla for training from May 1943 to July 1944 and operationally with the 7th flotilla from 1 August. She was then reassigned to the 11th flotilla on 1 October. She carried out three patrols, sinking no ships.

The boat's first patrol was preceded by a short voyage from Kiel on 15 August 1944 to Kristiansand in Norway, arriving there on 20 August.

First and second patrols
U-285s first patrol proper took her to northwest Scotland. She docked at Bergen on 18 September 1944.

Her second sortie was west of Ireland and into the St. George's Channel, (between southeast Ireland and southwest Wales). She had passed between Iceland and the Faroe Islands and into the Atlantic Ocean. The submarine returned to Bergen on 31 January 1945.

Third patrol and loss

Forty-four men died; there were no survivors.

References

Bibliography

External links

German Type VIIC submarines
U-boats commissioned in 1943
U-boats sunk in 1943
World War II submarines of Germany
World War II shipwrecks in the Atlantic Ocean
1943 ships
Ships built in Bremen (state)
Ships lost with all hands
U-boats sunk by British warships
Maritime incidents in April 1945